Aufseß, also sometimes spelled Aufsess, is a municipality in the district of Bayreuth in Bavaria, Germany.

Located in Franconian Switzerland on the Castle Road and the Franconian Bierstraße, or Beer Road, Aufseß is best known for its connection with the noble family of Aufsess, Knights of the Empire. Notable members of the family include Jobst Bernhard von und zu Aufsees, the founder of the Aufseesianum in Bamberg, Friedrich III von Aufseß, Prince-Bishop of Bamberg (1421–1431), and Hans von und zu Aufseß, who in 1852 was the principal founder of the Germanisches Nationalmuseum (formerly the "Germanischen Museums“) in Nuremberg.

References

External links

Bayreuth (district)